Christen Smith (17 October 1785 – 22 September 1816) was an early 19th-century Norwegian physician, economist and naturalist, particularly botanist. He died, only 30 years old during a dramatic expedition to the Congo River in 1816, leaving a wealth of botanical material.

Early years
Smith was born at Skoger in Drammen, Norway. He studied medicine and botany at the University of Copenhagen under Professor Martin Vahl. Together with Jens Wilken Hornemann, he traveled through large parts of Norway and carried out botanical investigations, collecting plants to be included in the plate work Flora Danica. Joakim Frederik Schouw and Morten Wormskjold were in the company for part of the trip. The party climbed several mountain tops in Jotunheimen, for some of which it was the first recorded ascent, e.g. Bitihorn 1811 and Hårteigen 1812.

The Canary and Madeira expeditions

In 1808, Smith graduated and started to practice medicine in Norway. In 1814, he was appointed professor of national economy and botany at the newly founded Royal Frederick University in Christiania (now Oslo). However, he never took up the position as he embarked upon travels abroad to establish contacts and keep abreast of the development of botanical gardens in Europe. His first journey took him to Scotland and from there to London, where he met the Prussian geologist Leopold von Buch.  Buch planned to visit the volcanic Canary Islands and Madeira, and Smith eagerly seized the opportunity to participate in an expedition with the experienced scientist. In 1815, the two embarked on the trip. They returned to Portsmouth on 8 December that year, Smith bringing 600 species of plants, of which about 50 were new to science. The best known of Smith's new species is probably Pinus canariensis, the Canary Island pine.

Death on the Congo
Having learned geology from Buch in addition to discovering new plant species, Smith was approached by the Royal Society of London and asked to participate in a scientific expedition under Captain James Hingston Tuckey to determine whether the Congo River had any connection to the Niger basins of western and central Africa. Smith was to function as the expedition's botanist and geologist. He had as assistant David Lockhart, who was to survive the journey.

The Congo expedition began in February 1816 and went badly from the start. The original plan was to sail up the river using the expedition ship "", which had originally been constructed as a steamboat, a technology that was still in its infancy. While the ship was eventually rigged for conventional sails, the heavy construction made it sit deep in the water. The accompanying lighter vessel "Dorothy" was also used but was stopped by rapids 160 km inland. The expedition continued on foot up along the Congo through mosquito-infested swamps. The expedition advanced 450 kilometres up the river, but lack of food, hostile natives and ravaging tropical fevers forced the expedition to turn back without having found the sought connection. On the way downriver, Smith caught a tropical fever (probably yellow fever) and died, less than a month shy of his 31st birthday. In all, 18 of the 56 members of the expedition perished, including all the scientists and the captain, who died after returning to the ship. The ill-fated expedition was part of the inspiration for Joseph Conrad's Heart of Darkness, written almost a century later.

Smith's legacy
Before succumbing to fever, Captain Tuckey made sure that Smith's diary and plant specimens were shipped to London. His collection from the trip consisted of 620 species, of which 250 proved to be new to science but had to be published by other botanists. Several of the texts he left behind were later published by his friend Martin Richard Flor.

Many species of plants have been named after Smith, e.g., Aeonium smithii Sims (1818) from Tenerife and the genus Christiana (Malvaceae: Brownlowioideae), discovered in Congo by Smith and described by Augustin Pyramus de Candolle in his Prodromus systematis naturalis regni vegetabilis (1824).

Also a species of snake, Grayia smythii, is named in honor of Christen Smith.

Notes and references

See also 
Observations, systematical and geographical, on the herbarium collected by Professor Christian Smith, in the vicinity of the Congo

1785 births
1816 deaths
University of Copenhagen alumni
19th-century Norwegian botanists
People from Drammen
19th-century Norwegian physicians